Thomas Haldin (born 11 July 1965) is a former professional tennis player from Sweden.

Career
Haldin made his ATP singles main draw debut at the 1987 Swedish Open as a qualifier, losing in the second round to world number 3 and second seed Stefan Edberg.

The Swede played mostly on the Challenger tour level and reached two finals.

Haldin has a career high ATP singles ranking of 138 achieved on 24 July 1989.

Challenger finals

Singles: 2 (0–2)

References

External links

1965 births
Living people
Swedish male tennis players
People from Jönköping
Sportspeople from Jönköping County
20th-century Swedish people